Steal My Melody is the second studio album by Swedish singer Markus Fagervall and was released on 15 October 2008.

Track listing
Close But No Cigar
Sun In My Eyes
Can You Feel It
You Will Sing
Walls
She
Again
Killing Time
Undercover Superhero
If You Don't Mean It
Walking Away

Personnel
Markus Fagervall - singer
Erik Zettervall - guitar
Joel Lindberg - bass
Johan Lundström - drums, percussion
Joel Sjödin - piano, synthesizer, programming
Patrik Berger - producer

Charts

References 

2008 albums
Markus Fagervall albums